Miroljub Ðorđević (born 27 November 1938) is a Serbian retired ice hockey player. He represented  in the men's tournament at the 1964 Winter Olympics and at the 1961 Ice Hockey World Championships.

References

External links
 
 

1938 births
Ice hockey players at the 1964 Winter Olympics
Living people
Olympic ice hockey players of Yugoslavia
Sportspeople from Belgrade
Serbian ice hockey forwards
Yugoslav ice hockey forwards